Orla is a river in middle-western Poland, a tributary of the Barycz. It meets the Barycz at the town of Wąsosz.

Rivers of Poland
Rivers of Greater Poland Voivodeship
Rivers of Lower Silesian Voivodeship